Senator Rand may refer to:

Anne Rand (born 1946), Maine State Senate
John L. Rand (1861–1942), Oregon State Senate
Rick Rand (born 1957), Kentucky State Senate
Tony Rand (born 1939), North Carolina State Senate
Walter Rand (1919–1995), New Jersey State Senate
E. M. Rands (1856–1922), Washington State Senate

See also
Rand Paul (born 1963), U.S. Senator from Kentucky since 2011